Hanguranketha Divisional Secretariat is a  Divisional Secretariat  of Nuwara Eliya District, of Central Province, Sri Lanka.

Poramadulla Central College is located in the Rikillagaskada community in Hanguranketha.

References

External links

 Divisional Secretariats Portal

Divisional Secretariats of Nuwara Eliya District
Geography of Nuwara Eliya District